Marilyn Mazur (born January 18, 1955) is an American-born Danish percussionist. Since 1975, she has worked as a percussionist with various groups, among them Six Winds with Alex Riel. Mazur is primarily an autodidact, but she has a degree in percussion from the Royal Danish Academy of Music.

Musical life
Mazur was born in New York City in 1955, from Polish and African-American parents, who moved with her to Denmark at age 6. She learned to play the piano, but when she was 19, she took up drumming, inspired by Al Foster, Airto Moreira, and Alex Riel. She started her first band in 1973, Zirenes. In 1978, she formed Primi, an all-woman theatre band. In 1985, she was asked to participate in the Palle Mikkelborg project that would become the Miles Davis album Aura, and soon after she went on the road with Miles Davis. Afterward, she played with Gil Evans, Wayne Shorter, Jan Garbarek, and Makiko Hirabayashi.

Her all-Scandinavian band Shamania consists of avant-garde female musicians.

The U.S. magazine Down Beat, in 1989, 1990, 1995, 1997, 1998 and 2002 selected Mazur as a "percussion-talent deserving wider recognition". In 2001, she was awarded the Jazzpar Prize, the world's largest international jazz prize.

Gallery

Honors
 Ben Webster Prize, Ben Webster Foundation, 1983
 JASA Prize, Danish jazz journalists, 1989
 Jazzpar Prize, 2001
 Edition Wilhelm Hansens Composer Prize, 2004
 Danish Django dOr (Legend), 2006
 Unlimited Communication, Telenor 2007
 EuroCore-JTI Jazz Award, 2010
 The Grethe Kolbe Grant, Danish Conductors Association,  2013
 No. 1 Jazz Performer, Down Beat, six times

Discography

As leader
 MM 4 with Mazur Markussen Kvartet (Rosen, 1984)
 Marilyn Mazur's Future Song (veraBra, 1992)
 Circular Chant (Storyville, 1995)
 Small Labyrinths (ECM, 1997)
 Colors with LLL-Mental (Hot Wire, 1997)
 Jordsange/Earth Songs (Dacapo, 2000)
 Poetic Justice with Lotte Anker, Marilyn Crispell (Dacapo, 2001)
 All the Birds: Reflecting + Adventurous (Stunt, 2002)
 Daylight Stories (Stunt, 2004)
 Elixir with Jan Garbarek (ECM, 2008)
 Tangled Temptations & the Magic Box (Stunt, 2010)
 Celestial Circle (ECM, 2011)
 Flamingo Sky (Stunt, 2014)
 Marilyn Mazur's Shamania (RareNoise, 2019)

As guest
With Lindsay Cooper
 Music from the Gold Diggers (Sync Pulse, 1983)
 Oh Moscow (Victo, 1991)
 Rags & the Golddiggers (ReR, 1991)

With Pierre Dorge
 Pierre Dorge & New Jungle Orchestra (SteepleChase, 1982)
 Brikama (SteepleChase, 1984)
 Even the Moon Is Dancing (SteepleChase, 1985)
 Canoe (Olufsen, 1986)
 Johnny Lives (SteepleChase, 1987)

With Jan Garbarek
 Twelve Moons (ECM, 1993)
 Visible World (ECM, 1996)
 Rites (ECM, 1998)

With Makiko Hirabayashi
 Makiko (Enja, 2006)
 Hide and Seek (Enja, 2009)
 Surely (Yellowbird, 2013)
 Where the Sea Breaks (Yellowbird, 2017)

With others
 Frans Bak, Natsange (Stunt, 1999)
 Jon Balke, Further (ECM, 1994)
 Peter Bastian, Northern Lights (Fonix Musik 1997)
 Harry Beckett & Pierre Dorge, Echoez of... (Olufsen, 1990)
 Kirsten Braten Berg, Stemmenes Skygge (Heilo, 2005)
 Ketil Bjornstad, Floating (Universal/EmArcy, 2005)
 Ketil Bjornstad, La Notte (ECM, 2013)
 Kristian Blak, Antifonale (Tutl, 1987)
 Birgit Bruel, Den Hemmelige Rude (Exlibris, 1985)
 Etta Cameron & Nikolaj Hess, Etta (Stunt, 2009)
 Carsten Dahl, Short Fairytales (EmArcy, 2006)
 Lars Danielsson, European Voices (Dragon, 1995)
 Miles Davis, Aura (Columbia, 1989)
 Gil Evans & Laurent Cugny, Rhythm A Ning  (EmArcy, 1988)
 Gil Evans & Laurent Cugny, Golden Hair  (EmArcy/Mercury 1989)
 Yelena Eckemoff, Forget-me-not (L&H, 2011)
 Agnes Buen Garnas, Han Rider Den Morke Natt (Via Music 2002)
 Caroline Henderson, Made in Europe (Stunt, 2004)
 Nikolaj Hess, Playin (Music Mecca, 2000)
 Nikolaj Hess, Rhapsody (Cloud, 2016)
 Jan Gunnar Hoff, Fly North (Losen, 2014)
 Robert Irving III, Midnight Dream (Verve Forecast/Polygram 1988)
 Morten Kaersa, Morten Kaersa & Moonjam (Replay, 1987)
 Iver Kleive, Kyrie (Kirkelig Kulturverksted, 1994)
 Peter Kowald, Duos Europa (FMP, 1991)
 Wolfgang Lackerschmid, Gently but Deep (Bhakti, 1996)
 Wolfgang Lackerschmid, Colors (Hot Wire, 1997)
 Michala Petri, Brazilian Landscapes (2017)
 Jean-Michel Pilc, Composing (Storyville, 2015)
 Caecilie Norby, Sisters in Jazz (ACT, 2019)
 Charlie Mariano, Innuendo (Lipstick, 1992)
 Niels-Henning Ørsted Pedersen, Uncharted Land (Pladecompagniet, 1992)
 Rena Rama, Rena Rama with Marilyn Mazur (Dragon, 1989)
 Helge Sunde, Denada (ACT, 2006)
 Helge Sunde, Finding Nymo (ACT, 2009)
 Eje Thelin, E.T. Project Live at Nefertiti (Dragon, 1986)
 Trondheim Voices, Improvoicing (MNJ, 2010)
 Hans Ulrik, Strange World (Stunt, 1994)
 Hans Ulrik, Suite of Time (Stunt, 2015)
 Andreas Vollenweider, Dancing with the Lion (Columbia, 1989)
 Andreas Vollenweider, Book of Roses (Columbia, 1991)
 Dhafer Youssef, Divine Shadows (Jazzland, 2006)
 Eberhard Weber, Stages of a Long Journey (ECM, 2007)

References

Sources
JAZZPAR

External links

 Marilyn Mazur's official website
 Marilyn Mazur on JAZZPAR Artists
 Future Song's official website

1955 births
Living people
Danish jazz musicians
American emigrants to Denmark
Danish people of Polish descent
Danish women composers
Women jazz musicians
Royal Danish Academy of Music alumni
Jazz percussionists
Danish jazz drummers
Danish percussionists
Miles Davis
Heilo Music artists
RareNoiseRecords artists
20th-century Danish musicians
20th-century women composers
21st-century Danish musicians
21st-century women composers
20th-century Danish composers
21st-century Danish composers